German Lottery is a novel by Miha Mazzini. It was first published in Slovenia in 2010, with a second edition in 2011, under the title of 'Nemška loterija'.

Plot
The novel is set in Yugoslavia in 1950. The communist regime has quarreled with the Soviet Union while being under blockade from the West. The country is isolated, poor, government secret agents are everywhere and people are disappearing during the night.

The protagonist is a naive young man, 18 years old, a war orphan who wasn't accepted in the army because of his bad knee; he is disabled, so the authorities decide - with communist logic - that he should become a postman. He arrives in the town, into corrupt and dangerous world of double- (and triple-) crossing swindlers, armed only with his naive optimism. He will entangle himself into the deadly world of German Lottery, a unique charity where every ticket is free and everyone wins, where stakes are getting higher and higher, until one day somebody wins a jackpot …

Translations
English edition was published in 2012 by CB editions.
German edition was published in 2016 by Transit Verlag.

References 
 Beletrina, Slovenian publisher
 Miha Mazzini's webpage

2010 novels
Slovenian novels
Novels set in the 1950s
Novels set in Yugoslavia